Sangchin or Sang Chin may refer to:
 Sangchin, Chaharmahal and Bakhtiari
 Sangchin, Kermanshah
 Sang Chin, Mazandaran
 Sangchin, North Khorasan